Leah Burridge is an English professional footballer who plays as a midfielder for Oxford United of the Women's National League South.

Club career

Yeovil Town 
In 2015, Burridge made her debut in a 1–0 away win at Oxford United in the WSL Cup. She had to wait a while for her to make her league debut which came in 2017 as a 77th-minute substitute for Natalie Haigh in a 0–0 away draw at Birmingham City in the FA WSL. Burridge successfully broke into the first team in 2017–18, making 17 appearances but not scoring any goals. in the 2018–19, Burridge made 6 appearances before going on loan to Plymouth Argyle.

Plymouth Argyle (loan) 
On 4 January 2019, finding it difficult to stay in the first team, Burridge went on loan to Plymouth Argyle for the remainder of the season joining former Yeovil Town players Natasha Knapman, Helen Bleazard, Jessie Jones and Lindsay Rogers.

Oxford United
In July 2022, Burridge signed for Oxford United.

References

External links
 
 

Year of birth missing (living people)
Living people
English women's footballers
Women's association football midfielders
Yeovil Town L.F.C. players
Oxford United W.F.C. players